The S1 is a railway service of RER Vaud that provides hourly service between  and  in the Swiss canton of Vaud. Swiss Federal Railways, the national railway company of Switzerland, operates the service.

Operations 
It is paired with the S2 (which does not make all local stops), providing half-hourly service between the two cities.

History 
The S1 was one of the six original lines of the RER Vaud, then called the Vaud Express Network (REV), when that system was established in December 2004. With the December 2015 timetable change, the northern and southern termini of the S1 changed to Grandson and Lausanne, respectively. The RER Vaud lines were substantially reorganized for the December 2022 timetable change. The S1 was extended from Lausanne to Cully on weekdays.

References

External links 

 2023 timetable: Grandson–Lausanne and Lausanne–Cully

RER Vaud lines
Transport in the canton of Vaud